Asociația Fotbal Club Dunărea 2005 Călărași, commonly known as Dunărea Călărași, is a Romanian professional football club from the city of Călărași, Călărași County.

Founded in 1962, Valahii currently play in the Liga II, after finishing 13th out of 14 at the end of the 2018–19 Liga I season.

History

Celuloza Călărași (1962–1979)
Dunărea Călărași was founded in 1962 as Celuloza Călărași, but it was not the first football club of Călărași. In 1919 football appeared in the city from the Danube banks and Ialomița Călărași was founded, an amateur club which used to be the main attraction of the Sunday events, the day when everyone enjoyed a well spent time. Over the years a lot of amateur clubs like: Tricolorul, Venus, FC and Energia have contributed to the evolution of local football, eventually leading to the creation of the first professional club, Celuloza.

Appearing quite late on the stage of the Romanian football, Celuloza did not have a fulminating climb at all, being a team that grew from year to year. For the first 6 years of its existence the club played in the Divizia D, then in 1968 Celuloza promoted to Divizia C. The club ended the 1968–69 season on 11th place, ensuring its presence also in the next season. In the following seasons Celuloza had very good results: 1969–70 – 5th, 1970–71 – 9th, 1971–72 – 5th, then making a sensational 1972–73 season, at the end of which the team promoted for the first time in its history to the Divizia B. Celuloza promoted with an advance of 8 points ahead Autobuzul București.

First Divizia B season was a good one for the Vlachs, which ended on the 11th place, result followed by other good rankings in the next seasons: 1974–75 – 8th and 1975–76 – 11th, then a seasons in which the team saved from relegation with some emotions: 1976–77 – 14th and finally Celuloza relegated back to Divizia C at the end of 1977–78, when the club finished only on the 15th place. After relegation Celuloza tried to fight for promotion, but failed, ending only on the 4th place.

Dunărea, an oscillating team (1979–1998)
In August 1979 Celuloza changed its name to Dunărea (The Danube), a name considered more representative and closer to the spectators' soul, change that also has brought new ambitions, the goal being to return to the second league. In the first season as Dunărea the team ended only on 3rd place, but the promotion would come a year later, when the Vlachs promoted with an advance of 8 points ahead Portul Constanța, the same distance as at its last promotion.

First Divizia B season, after the comeback, was a very good one, Dunărea finishing 7th out of 18, but the team could not keep their form relegating at the end of the 1983–84 season, finishing the last one, with only 22 points. Returned to Divizia C, Dunărea promoted after a single season, finishing 1st, with 7 points ahead of Chimia Victoria Buzău. Dunărea relegated then after only one season in Divizia B, finishing only on 16th place. After these seasons Dunărea started to be considered a team, somewhere between Divizia B and Divizia C, a reputation that followed the club throughout its existence. For the 1986–87 season the club name was changed to Oțelul and the team finished on 3rd place, then from 1987 the club has returned to the old name, Dunărea, auspicious change, the team promoting back into the second league at the end of the 1987–88 season. After only one season in Divizia B, Dunărea relegated again to Divizia C.

The yellow and blues continued their oscillating results finishing 8th at the end of 1989–90 Divizia C season, then promoting back to Divizia B, but only at the end of the 1991–92 season, season in which the club obtained the best performance in its entire history, a Cupa României quarter-final, being eliminated by Politehnica Timișoara, a team from Divizia A by 1–0 win at home and 0–2 lost away. In that edition, Politehnica Timișoara played the cup final against Steaua București. To qualify in the Quarter-finals, the team eliminated Gloria Bistriţa also a team from Divizia A by 3–2 and after they won against ASA 1962 Târgu Mureș, another team from Divizia A, by 2–1. In Divizia C table Dunărea was deducted 4 points and finally missed the promotion from financial reasons and changed its name again in the summer of 1992, this time to Sportul. Two seasons played the team under this name: 1992–93 – 4th and 1993–94 – 2nd. From the summer of 1994 the team changed back its name to Dunărea and promoted back to Divizia B after 5 seasons, finishing 2nd at 8 points from Oțelul Târgoviște and 6 points ahead of Astra Ploiești.

The Vlachs remained at this level for 3 seasons: 1995–96 – 10th, 1996–97 – 9th and 1997–98 – 17th.

Liga III years (1998–2015)
After relegation, Dunărea struggled to come back, but without much success, following the darkest period in the history of the club with 17 years in the Liga III without any season in the Liga II and with some financial problems also, around 2005.

Between 1998 and 2005, due to poor financial situation Dunărea began to blaze somewhere in the middle of the third league rankings: 1998–99 – 13th, 1999–2000 – 7th, 2000–01 – 8th, 2001–02 – 6th, 2002–03 – 7th and 2003–04 – 8th. In 2005 there has been a restructuring of the club from a legal and even financial point of view and the results have begun to appear: 2004–05 – 3rd and 2005–06 – 2nd. But after this short period in which the club showed that it can fight for promotion, followed a new period of contrasting results: 2006–07 – 8th, 2007–08 – 13th, 2008–09 – 6th, 2009–10 – 8th, 2010–11 – 4th, 2011–12 – 12th. In this period Dunărea did not seem to have a serious goal, except to stay somewhere in the upper part of the Liga III and even the bringing of Ion Moldovan, an experienced coach, in 2007 didn't resolve too much.

From 2012 the yellow and blues started to look again as a team that is capable to promote with 2 4th place in the 2012–13 and 2013–14 seasons. In 2015 the ex-international player Ionel Ganea was hired as the new manager of the team and with important players for this level, like: Constantin Bumbac and Valentin Alexandru the team achieved, at the end of the season, the promotion to Liga II after 17 years of waiting.

Golden Age of Dunărea (2015–present)
After the promotion Dunărea made an exceptional first Liga II season and finished on the 2nd place, at only three points from the leader, Rapid București and qualified for the promotion play-off where it played against 2nd place from the second series of Liga II, UTA Arad. In the first match, played at Călărași Dunărea won 3-1 and the dream of Liga I was more present than ever, on the banks of the Danube, but the second match of the play-off was a nightmare, the Vlachs lost 1–4 at Arad and remained in the Liga II for another season. Also during this season Ionel Ganea was changed with another ex-international player, Adrian Mihalcea.

2016–17 Liga II season has brought major changes, going to the one-series format, in this situation Dunărea made a season more than honorable and finished on the 7th place, out of 20. In the summer of 2017 Adrian Mihalcea was changed with Adrian Iencsi and Iencsi after only one round with Dan Alexa. After Alexa's arrival, the team has returned miraculously and from a team of last places entered in the winter break from the 1st place, 1 point ahead of 2nd place, FC Hermannstadt and 7 points ahead of 3rd place Chindia Târgoviște. This was possible after an incredible series of 18 matches without losing, the dream of promotion being more real than ever. The second part of the season was just a continuation of the first part, Dunărea reaching a record of 32 matches without losing, including 13 winning matches in a row. Despite the fact that the direct opponent, FC Hermannstadt, was also a tough team, with a record of 34 matches without losing, and also the runners-up of the 2017–18 Cupa României, the Vlachs managed to finish 1st earning the first trophy in the history of the club and also the first personalized trophy of the Liga II. This performance has ensured their promotion in the Liga I, the first in the history of the club and the Călărași County.

Ground

Dunărea plays its home matches on Stadionul Ion Comșa from Călărași, with a capacity of 10,400 seats. In the late spring of 2018 when the promotion to Liga I was safe, it was announced that the stadium will be renovated and modernized. The works have begun in the first half of June and included a completely change of the pitch, a partial change of the stands structure and a potential acquisition of a floodlight installation.

Honours

Domestic

Leagues
Liga II
Winners (1): 2017–18
Runners-up (1): 2015–16
Liga III
Winners (6): 1972–73, 1980–81, 1984–85, 1987–88, 1991–92, 2014–15
Runners-up (3): 1993–94, 1994–95, 2005–06

Cup
 Quarterfinals: 1991–92, 2018–19, 2020–21

Players

First-team squad

Out on loan

Club officials

Board of directors

Current technical staff

League history

Notable former managers
 
 Ionel Ganea
 Gabriel Stan
 Valeriu Petrescu
 Adrian Mihalcea
 Dan Alexa

References

External links
 Official website
 Club profile on UEFA's official website

 
Association football clubs established in 1962
Football clubs in Călărași County
Călărași
Liga II clubs
Liga III clubs
1962 establishments in Romania